Jai Shri Krishna (English: Hail Lord Krishna) is an Indian drama television series produced by Sagar Pictures, which aired on Colors from 21 July 2008 to 15 September 2009. 
It is the remake of Ramanand Sagar's successful show Sri Krishna and was handled by Moti Sagar (son of Ramanand Sagar) of Sagar Pictures. It is based on Mahabharata, Harivamsa, Bhagavata Purana and the Vishnu Purana.

Plot 
Jai Shri Krishna tells the story of the Bhagavan Vishnu's avatar, Shree Krishna. The story takes place in India, covering cities like Gokhul, Mathura, Hastinapur, and Dawaraka. It shows the different leelas, or stories, of Shree Krishna from his birth, childhood, teenage years, and time as prince of Mathura and prince of Dwarka.

The program touched on many different aspects of his life, through the retelling of the leelas, it is told that he was known as Makhan Chor (butter thief) and of his eternal friendship with Sudama as a good example of true friendship. Other aspects include some of his adventures, such as when he killed the demon queen Putana and tamed the venomous serpent Kaliya. Yet another amazing story was how as a little boy he showed the entire universe in his open mouth to his foster Mother, Yashoda.

As a teenager he shared a divine relationship with Radha. His dance with the Gopis (milkmaids) of Vrindavana became known as the Rasa lila. Later, when he became a fully grown man, the series tells about how he slayed his evil uncle, Kans (although, in the actual tales, Krishna was much younger when he slayed his uncle – he may have been as young as 12 years old).

After becoming a prince, Krishna married Rukmini, believed to be forms of the goddess Lakshmi, who is the consort of Vishnu.

The series portrays Lord Shree Krishna as the perfect son, husband, brother, friend, king and lover of many. The show followed every aspect of Lord Krishna's life up until Lord Krishna's teenage years.

Cast

Broadcast
A shortened version for kids also aired on Nickelodeon India in 2009. A new character of "Grandmother" was added to narrate the series.

References

External links 
 Official Website
 

2008 Indian television series debuts
2009 Indian television series endings
Colors TV original programming
Indian television soap operas
Television shows based on poems
Television series based on Mahabharata
Krishna in popular culture